"If Anybody Gets Funked Up (It's Gonna Be You)" is a 1996 single by American group George Clinton & the P-Funk All-Stars, from their album, T.A.P.O.A.F.O.M..

Charts

References

1996 singles
1996 songs
Songs written by George Clinton (funk musician)
Epic Records singles
Song recordings produced by Erick Sermon